Spassky Pogost is a rural locality (a selo) in Spasskoye Rural Settlement, Tarnogsky District, Vologda Oblast, Russia. The population was 225 as of 2002.

Geography 
Spassky Pogost is located 33 km northwest of Tarnogsky Gorodok (the district's administrative centre) by road. Nikiforovskaya is the nearest rural locality.

References 

Rural localities in Tarnogsky District